The term canon derives from the Greek , meaning "rule", and thence via Latin and Old French into English. The concept in English usage is very broad: in a general sense it refers to being one (adjectival) or a group (noun) of official, authentic or approved rules or laws, particularly ecclesiastical; or group of official, authentic, or approved literary or artistic works, such as the literature of a particular author, of a particular genre, or a particular group of religious scriptural texts; or similarly, one or a body of rules, principles, or standards accepted as axiomatic and universally binding in a religion, or a field of study or art.

Examples
This principle of grouping has led to more specific uses of the word in different contexts, such as the Biblical canon (which a particular religious community regards as authoritative) and thence to literary canons (of a particular "body of literature in a particular language, or from a particular culture, period, genre").

W.C Sayers (1915–1916) established a system of canons of library classification.

S. R. Ranganathan developed a theory of facet analysis, which he presented as a detailed series of 46 canons, 13 postulates and 22 principles.

There is also the concept of the canons of rhetoric, including five key principles that, when grouped together, are the principles set for giving speeches.

See also

 
 
 
 Axiom: a statement that is taken to be true, to serve as a starting point for further reasoning and arguments.
 Canon (disambiguation)
 
 
Der Kanon, set of canonical German literature, set by Marcel Reich-Ranicki
 Norm (philosophy): concepts (sentences) of practical import, oriented to effecting an action
 Principle: rule that has to be followed or is an inevitable consequence of something, such as the laws observed in nature
 Rule of inference: in logic, a logical form consisting of a function which takes premises, analyzes their syntax, and returns a conclusion (or conclusions) 
 Rhetoric: the art of persuasion. The five canons of rhetoric or phases of developing a persuasive speech were first codified in classical Rome: invention, arrangement, style, memory, and delivery.
 Western canon: the body of literature, music, philosophy, and works of art that is highly valued in Western culture

References

Principles
Logic